Jacques Edmond Haller (3 March 1897 – 19 December 1961) was a Belgian rower who won two bronze medals at the European championships of 1920–1921. He competed at the 1920 Summer Olympics in the single scull event, but failed to reach the final.

References

1897 births
1961 deaths
Olympic rowers of Belgium
Rowers at the 1920 Summer Olympics
Belgian male rowers
Rowers from Ghent
European Rowing Championships medalists
20th-century Belgian people